Daniel Persson (born 1982) is a Swedish politician. He was elected as Member of the Riksdag in September 2022. He represents the constituency of Gävleborg County. He is affiliated with the Sweden Democrats.

References 

Living people
1982 births
Place of birth missing (living people)
21st-century Swedish politicians
Members of the Riksdag 2022–2026
Members of the Riksdag from the Sweden Democrats